Liam McHale (born 1 June 1965) is a Gaelic football coach and former player (and basketball player) who played in midfield with the Mayo county football team between 1985 and 1999.

He played from the start in four finals of the All-Ireland Senior Football Championship (including one replay), but was never successful in winning the All-Ireland Senior Football Championship.

Football career
McHale started the 1989 All-Ireland Senior Football Championship Final, which was won narrowly by Cork.

McHale started the 1996 All-Ireland Senior Football Championship Final. It ended in a draw and a replay followed. Meath defeated Mayo, avenging their defeat to the same opposition in the 1951 decider. McHale was sent off, along with Meath's Colm Coyle. He had been man of the match in the drawn game. However, he did win an All Star award later that year.

McHale started the 1997 All-Ireland Senior Football Championship Final, in which Mayo was defeated by Kerry.

Basketball career
McHale won two national basketball Cups with his club Ballina (in 1991 and 1996), as well as a Super League title.

Coaching career
McHale was a Gaelic football selector on the Mayo team that reached the 2004 All-Ireland Senior Football Championship Final, which Mayo lost to Kerry.

In 2013, McHale was involved in coaching the successful St Brigid's GAA team which won the All-Ireland Senior Club Football Championship, under manager Kevin McStay.

In October 2014, it was announced McHale would join the Cavan backroom team.

McHale also served as a selector of the Roscommon GAA squad which won the 2017 Connacht Senior Football Championship. However, his charges were heavily defeated in an All-Ireland quarter-final replay against his native Mayo.

In December 2019, Westmeath GAA club Athlone confirmed that McHale would be its new senior manager.

After Kevin McStay was appointed as manager of the Mayo senior team in 2022, McStay named him as a coach and selector.

Personal life
McHale now lives in Carrentrilla in Ballina, County Mayo.

References

External links
Hogan Stand article
Joe.ie interview

1965 births
Living people
Ballina Stephenites Gaelic footballers
Connacht inter-provincial Gaelic footballers
Gaelic football coaches
Gaelic football managers
Gaelic football selectors
Irish men's basketball players
Mayo inter-county Gaelic footballers
People from Ballina, County Mayo